Bruce Holland (born 1959) is a Canadian politician. He represented the electoral district of Timberlea-Prospect in the Nova Scotia House of Assembly from 1993 to 1998. He was a member of the Nova Scotia Liberal Party. In 2017, Holland ran as a candidate for the PC Party of Nova Scotia in Halifax Atlantic. Holland is currently the executive director of the Spryfield Business Commission and the publisher and founder of the Parkview News, a locally distributed paper.

Early life
Holland graduated from Sir John A. Macdonald High School.

Political career
Holland was a county councilor for Halifax County, Nova Scotia from 1991 to 1993. He entered provincial politics in the 1993 election, winning a seat in the provincial legislature. In 1997, he entered the race for the leadership of the Nova Scotia Liberal Party, but finished last on the first ballot. At the convention, after receiving 264 votes on the first ballot, Holland played a king-maker role by throwing his support to Russell MacLellan who was 121 votes short of winning. On July 18, 1997, MacLellan appointed Holland to the Executive Council of Nova Scotia as Minister responsible for the Science and Technology Secretariat. Holland was defeated by New Democrat Bill Estabrooks when he ran for re-election in the 1998 election. Holland attempted to regain the seat in the 2003 election, but finished second, losing to Estabrooks by over 3200 votes.

In June 2016, Holland announced he was running for a seat on Halifax Regional Council in the 2016 municipal election. On October 15, 2016, he placed third out of six candidates in his district.

In April 2017, Holland was nominated as the Progressive Conservative candidate in Halifax Atlantic for the 2017 Nova Scotia general election.

In March 2019, Holland was nominated as the Conservative candidate in Halifax for the 2019 federal election. He finished a distant fourth.

Electoral record

2019 general election

District 12 - Halifax Municipal Election 2016: Timberlea - Beechville - Clayton Park West-Wedgewood

2017 general election

1993 general election

|-

|-
 
|New Democratic Party
|Bill Estabrooks
|align="right"|2,772
|align="right"|30.85
|align="right"|
 
|Progressive Conservative
|Debi Forsyth-Smith 
|align="right"|2,744
|align="right"|30.54
|align="right"|
|}

References

Living people
Nova Scotia Liberal Party MLAs
Members of the Executive Council of Nova Scotia
Nova Scotia municipal councillors
Place of birth missing (living people)
1959 births